Muhammad Saleh Thattvi (1074 AH/1663–64 AD), Mughal metallurgist, astronomer, geometer and craftsman, was born and raised in Thatta, Sindh province in Pakistan, during the reign of the Mughal Emperor Shah Jahan and the governorship of the Mughal Nawab Mirza Ghazi Beg of Sindh.  During those years young metallurgists were recruited, patronized and delivered to the Mughal court at Agra.

Celestial globe
In 1559, Muhammad Saleh Thattvi headed the task of creating a massive, seamless celestial globe using a secret cire perdue method in the Mughal Empire, the famous celestial globe of Muhammad Saleh Tahtawi is inscribed with Arabic and Persian inscriptions.  Twenty other such globes were produced in Lahore and Kashmir during the Mughal Empire. It is considered a major feat in metallurgy.

Legacy 
According to historians the first person to create a seamless celestial globe in the Mughal Empire was Ali Kashmiri ibn Luqman in (998 AH/1589-90 AD) he created many masterpieces in Kashmir in the reign of the Mughal Emperor Akbar, and during his rule the craft found its way into the city of Lahore and its workshops were most prolific, because there Metallurgists made making precision seamlessly cast globes.  But the most prolific and largest was made during the reign of Mughal Emperor Shah Jahan by Muhammad Salih Tahtawi in (1074 AH/1665 AD) and is of interest for being inscribed in both Arabic and Persian.  Seamlessly cast globes continued to be made in Lahore up to the mid-nineteenth century.

References 

Mughal Empire
Indian metallurgists
Sindhi people
Astronomers of the medieval Islamic world
Mathematicians of the medieval Islamic world
History of Sindh